Wayne Everett Coffey (born May 30, 1964) is a former American football wide receiver who played one season with the New England Patriots of the National Football League. He first enrolled at Cisco College before transferring to Texas State University. He attended Abilene High School in Abilene, Texas. Coffey was also a member of the Arena Football League teams Denver Dynamite, Sacramento Attack, Cincinnati Rockers, Miami Hooters and Las Vegas Sting.

References

External links
Just Sports Stats

Living people
1964 births
Players of American football from Illinois
American football wide receivers
African-American players of American football
Cisco Wranglers football players
Texas State Bobcats football players
New England Patriots players
Denver Dynamite (arena football) players
Sacramento Attack players
Cincinnati Rockers players
Miami Hooters players
Las Vegas Sting players
People from Rantoul, Illinois
21st-century African-American people
20th-century African-American sportspeople